Niepołomice (pronounced) is a town in southern Poland, within the Lesser Poland Voivodeship (since 1999). 

It is situated on the Vistula River, on the verge of the large virgin Niepołomice Forest. 

There is a 14th-century hunting castle in town initially built by Casimir III, as well as a conservation center for European bison nearby.

The town is also home to professional football club Puszcza Niepołomice.

External links

 Official website
 Summary (in English) of Niepołomice
 Jewish Community in Niepołomice on Virtual Shtetl

Cities and towns in Lesser Poland Voivodeship
Wieliczka County